Freddy Cole Sings Mr. B is a 2010 tribute album by American jazz musician, Freddy Cole, released in 2010 on HighNote Records.

The album is a tribute to bebop pioneer Billy Eckstine. In 2011 it was recognized with a Grammy nomination for 'Best Jazz Vocal Album' at the 53rd Annual Grammy Awards.

The album received attention both for the subject of its tribute and for the performances.

Personnel 
 Freddy Cole – vocals
 Randy Napoleon – guitar, arrangements
 John di Martino – piano, arrangements
 Houston Person – tenor saxophone
 Elias Bailey – bass
 Curtis Boyd – Drums

References

Freddy Cole albums
2018 albums
HighNote Records albums